Princess Marie of Battenberg (15 February 1852 – 20 June 1923) was a Princess of Battenberg and, by marriage, the Princess of Erbach-Schönberg. She worked as a writer and translator.

Background and early life
Marie was the eldest child and only daughter of Prince Alexander of Hesse and by Rhine (1823–1888), founder of the House of Battenberg and his morganatic wife, the Countess Julia Hauke (1825–1895), daughter of the Polish Count John Maurice Hauke. As a result of a morganatic marriage, Marie and her siblings were excluded from the succession of the Grand Duchy of Hesse, and bore the title Princes of Battenberg. Conceived six months before her parents married, Marie always told people that her birthday was the 15th of  July instead of the 15th of February. She was born 15 February in Strasbourg and not 15 July in Geneva.

Marie grew up in a wholesome family environment which was remarked upon by their royal relatives for its harmony and simplicity. She was the eldest of five children and she had four younger brothers, each highly distinguished in his own right. The eldest of her brothers was the distinguished British First Sea Lord, Prince Louis of Battenberg, father of Louisa, Queen of Sweden and of Earl Mountbatten; he was also the maternal grandfather of Prince Philip. Her second brother was Prince Alexander of Battenberg, who was elected Prince of Bulgaria (equivalent to king) in 1879. Her third brother was Prince Henry of Battenberg, who married Princess Beatrice, a daughter of Queen Victoria, and was the father of Victoria Eugenie, Queen of Spain. Her fourth and youngest brother was Prince Francis Joseph of Battenberg, who married a daughter of king Nicholas I of Montenegro, but they had no children. In this way, Marie was related to a wide swathe of European royalty.

Marie was a godmother to her niece, Princess Alice of Battenberg, mother of Prince Philip, Duke of Edinburgh.

Marriage and family
The Princess married on 19 April 1871 in Darmstadt, Count Gustav Ernst of Erbach-Schönberg (1840–1908), who was elevated to the rank of Prince in 1903. They had four children:
Alexander, Prince of Erbach-Schönberg (12 September 1872 – 18 October 1944). He married Princess Elisabeth of Waldeck and Pyrmont, a sister of Emma, Queen of the Netherlands, in 1900. They had four children. 
Count Maximilian of Erbach-Schönberg (17 March 1878 – 25 March 1892). He was mentally unstable and died at the age of fourteen.
Prince Victor of Erbach-Schönberg (26 September 1880 – 27 April 1967); married Countess Elisabeth Széchényi de Sarvar et Felsö-Vidék in 1909.
Princess Marie Elisabeth of Erbach-Schönberg (7 July 1883–12 Mar 1966); married Prince Friedrich Wilhelm of Stolberg-Wernigerode (grandson of Otto of Stolberg-Wernigerode) in 1910. With issue

Literary works
Marie's brother Alexander was invited to the throne of Bulgaria in 1879 and became Prince of Bulgaria under the nominal suzerainty of the Caliph of Turkey. Her memoir of a visit to his court, My Trip to Bulgaria, was published in 1884.
Marie also published her memoirs, which places her relationship with her mentally-unstable son Maximilian in an essential role.
Marie translated two works authored by Edith Jcob, The Gate of Paradise and An Easter Dream. 
She also translated A Trip to Siberia by Kate Marsden.

Ancestry

References

 Marie of Erbach-Schönberg: Memoirs of Princess Marie of Erbach-Schönberg, Princess of Battenberg, 1852–1923, and V. 1958 
 Marie von Erbach-Schönberg: Meine Reise nach Bulgarien im Jahre 1884, Heller, 1916 Marie of Erbach-Schoenberg: My trip to Bulgaria in 1884, Heller, 1916
 Sophie Pataky: Lexikon deutscher Frauen der Feder, Bd. 1. Sophie Pataky: Encyclopedia of German women of the pen, 1st Bd Berlin, 1898., . Berlin, 1898.

1852 births
1923 deaths
Battenberg family
Writers from Geneva
House of Erbach-Schönberg